The Second Half is an American sitcom television series created by Leo Benvenuti, Steve Rudnick and John Mendoza, that aired on NBC from September 7, 1993 to April 15, 1994. The series was executive-produced and co-created by its star, John Mendoza.

Premise
A divorced sports columnist for The Chicago Daily Post has to deal with his ex-wife, weekend visits from his two daughters and romance in the '90s. John's column was called The Second Half.

Cast
John Mendoza as John Palmaro
Wayne Knight as Robert Piccolo
Ellen Blain as Cathy Palmaro
Brooke Stanley as Ruth Palmaro
Joe Guzaldo as David Keller
Jessica Lundy as Denise Palmaro
Mindy Cohn as Maureen Tucker

Episodes

References

External links

1993 American television series debuts
1994 American television series endings
1990s American sitcoms
English-language television shows
NBC original programming
Television series by Castle Rock Entertainment
Television shows set in Chicago
Latino sitcoms